Ko Yee Estate is a public housing estate in Yau Tong, Kowloon, Hong Kong. It is built as a part of the demolished Ko Chiu Road Estate. The estate comprises four blocks offering 1,300 units completed between 1994 and 2000.

Background
The estate was formerly known as blocks 3 to 6 of Ko Chiu Road Estate, it was completed in 1972 and the demolition project started in 1991. The blocks were only 19 years old at the time of demolition. Four new houses were rebuilt as part of the demolished Ko Chiu Road Estate.

Houses

Demographics
According to the 2016 by-census, Ko Yee Estate had a population of 3,326. The median age was 46.4 and the majority of residents (99.1 per cent) were of Chinese ethnicity. The average household size was 2.8 people. The median monthly household income of all households (i.e. including both economically active and inactive households) was HK$23,360.

Politics
Ko Yee Estate is located in Yau Tong East constituency of the Kwun Tong District Council. It is currently represented by Ricky Kung Chun-ki, who was elected in the 2019 elections.

See also

Public housing estates in Yau Tong

References

Yau Tong
Residential buildings completed in 1994
Residential buildings completed in 2000
Public housing estates in Hong Kong
1994 establishments in Hong Kong
2000 establishments in Hong Kong